Centennial Lake is a reservoir lake in the Township of Greater Madawaska, Renfrew County and the Township of North Frontenac, Frontenac County in Eastern Ontario, Canada. It is on the Madawaska River and is part of the Saint Lawrence River drainage basin.

The lake is "L" shaped, with the downstroke oriented northwest/southeast, and the cross stroke oriented northeast/southwest. All but a tiny tip at the south end of the lake, the crux of the "L", is in the Township of Greater Madawaska, Renfrew County. The major inflow, at Camel Chute at the northwest, is the Madawaska River. A second primary inflow is Mackie Creek at the south, controlled by a weir dam. The major outflow is also the Madawaska River, which flows directly into Black Donald Lake at the northeast. The Madawaska River then flows via the Ottawa River to the Saint Lawrence River and thence to the Atlantic Ocean. Renfrew County Road 65 crosses the northwest arm of the lake over a long, low, concrete bridge.

History
Centennial Lake, and Black Donald Lake adjacent downstream, were created by the construction of the Mountain Chute Generating Station and dam and an associated embankment dam in 1965–1966. Black Donald Lake subsumed the previous White Fish Lake and drowned the former mining community of Black Donald Mines, whose graphite mine by then had been exhausted. The reservoir took six months to fill and flooded .

The lake is primarily used for recreation, tourism and cottages.

Tributaries
Clockwise from the inflow of the Madawaska River
Morrow Creek
Mackie Creek
Colton Creek
Glenfield Creek

See also
List of lakes in Ontario

References

Reservoirs in Canada
Lakes of Renfrew County
Lakes of Frontenac County